Lori McCreary is an American film producer. She is CEO of the production company Revelations Entertainment, which she co-founded with actor Morgan Freeman.

Early life
McCreary grew up in Antioch, California. She graduated from Antioch High School in 1979.

McCreary graduated from UCLA with a degree in Computer Science in 1984. While in college, she co-founded the legal software company CompuLaw.

Career 
McCreary's appreciation for the stage play Bopha! inspired her to go into motion picture production.

McCreary first met actor Morgan Freeman, who was signed to direct the film adaptation, in Arsenio Hall's office on the Paramount Pictures Lot in 1992.

Later, the pair partnered in the formation of Revelations Entertainment in 1996 with a mission to produce entertainment "that reveals truth". As Revelations CEO, McCreary produced The Magic of Belle Isle, directed by Rob Reiner. Before that, she produced Invictus, directed by Clint Eastwood, with Freeman starring as Nelson Mandela and co-starring Matt Damon.

She is currently Executive Producer of CBS's hit series Madam Secretary starring Téa Leoni. She is also Executive producer of The Story of God with Morgan Freeman, the highest-rated series in NatGeo's history, as well as the expansion series The Story of Us with Morgan Freeman. She was the Executive Producer of Discovery Science's Through the Wormhole With Morgan Freeman.

McCreary's additional producer credits include Mimi Leder's Thick as Thieves with Antonio Banderas and The Maiden Heist starring Christopher Walken, William H. Macy, Marcia Gay Harden and Morgan Freeman. Revelations also co-produced Along Came a Spider for Paramount Pictures.

In July 2005, Revelations Entertainment teamed with Intel to form a new digital entertainment company, ClickStar. ClickStar officially launched their site on December 15, 2006, where it was the first website to legally make a movie (Revelation's 10 Items or Less) available for download while it was still in theaters.

McCreary sits on the Board of the Producers Guild of America (PGA) and as of June 2014, was elected along with Gary Lucchesi. McCreary still holds this post. She is the Founder of the PGA's Motion Picture Technology Committee and sits on the Producers Council of the PGA and on the Technology Committee of the American Society of Cinematographers. She is also a member of The Society of Motion Picture and Television Engineers (SMPTE) and The Institute of Electrical and Electronics Engineers, Inc. (IEEE). In addition, she was profiled by The Hollywood Reporter in its 100 Most Powerful Women in Hollywood issue.

Filmography
 The Killing of Kenneth Chamberlain (2019)
 Madam Secretary (CBS TV Series 2014–2019) Seasons 1, 2, 3 and 4
 The Story of Us with Morgan Freeman
 The Story of God with Morgan Freeman
 The C Word (2016 film)
 Curiosity: Season 1, Episode 5 - Is There a Parallel Universe? (4 Sep. 2011)
 Through The Wormhole with Morgan Freeman (Discovery Science Channel TV Series 2010-2015) Seasons 1 to Season 6
 2012 Image Control Assessment Series (2012)
 Stem Cell Universe with Stephen Hawking (2014) (TV)
 "Man vs. the Universe" (2014)
 5 Flights Up (2014)
 The Magic of Belle Isle (2012) (completed) (producer)
 Invictus (2009) (completed) (producer)
 The Maiden Heist (2008) (completed) (producer)
 Thick as Thieves (2008) (completed) (producer)
 Feast of Love (2007) (completed) (executive producer)
 The Contract (2006)
 Levity (2003) (executive producer)
 10 Items or Less (2006) (producer)
 Along Came a Spider (2001) (company credit)
 Under Suspicion (2000) (producer) (credited as Lori Mccreary)
 Mutiny (1999) (TV) (executive producer)
 Bopha! (1993) (co-producer)

References

External links
Revelations Entertainment

Lori McCreary profile at Clickstar.
Interview with producer Lori McCreary, May 9, 2002.
ClickStar

American computer scientists
Film producers from California
People from Antioch, California
Year of birth missing (living people)
American women computer scientists
Living people
21st-century American women
UCLA Henry Samueli School of Engineering and Applied Science alumni